Dos amigos y un amor is a 1938  Argentine musical film comedy directed by Lucas Demare. The film was premièred in Buenos Aires.

External links

1938 films
Argentine musical comedy films
1930s Spanish-language films
Argentine black-and-white films
Films directed by Lucas Demare
1938 musical comedy films
1938 directorial debut films
1930s Argentine films